On 14 March 2022, during the 2022 Russian invasion of Ukraine, a Tochka-U missile attack hit the center of Donetsk, Ukraine, at the time under Russian occupation and administration of the Donetsk People's Republic (DPR). The Russian Investigative Committee reported that the attack killed 23 civilians, including children, and injured at least 18 people. The Office of the High Commissioner for Human Rights reported that the attacked killed 15 civilians and injured 36 people. Ukraine claimed that the rocket had been fired by the Russians, while Russia and the DPR claimed that the attack was carried out by Ukrainian forces. As of 14 March, neither the Russian nor the Ukrainian claims could be independently verified.

Conflicting versions 
According to the Ministry of Defense of the Russian Federation, the missile was launched from the Pokrovsk Raion, controlled by the Ukrainian forces. The Russian Ministry also claimed that "the use of such weapons against a city where there is no armed forces firing position is a war crime." Denis Pushilin, head of the self-proclaimed DPR, said that the missile carried a cluster munition warhead, which led to so many casualties, and claimed that the missile had been shot down by DPR defense systems.

Leonid Matyukhin, a spokesperson for the Ukraine Military, said that the missile, which carried a shrapnel warhead, was a Russian rocket. "It is unmistakably a Russian rocket or another munition; there's not even any point talking about it." In an interview on 15 March, Ruslan Leviev, founder of the Conflict Intelligence Team, said photos from the incident suggest the missile originated from Russian-controlled territory and was not shot down by DPR air defense systems.

Gallery

See also 
 Maisky Market attack
 September 2022 Donetsk attack

References 

March 2022 events in Ukraine
Donetsk
History of Donetsk
Attacks on buildings and structures in 2022
Airstrikes during the 2022 Russian invasion of Ukraine
2022 controversies
War crimes during the 2022 Russian invasion of Ukraine
21st-century mass murder in Ukraine
Mass murder in 2022